Dead Reckoning Records is an American independent record label specializing in country music. The label was established in 1994 by musicians Kevin Welch, Kieran Kane, Mike Henderson, Tammy Rogers, and Harry Stinson produce their records without the frustrations of a major record label.

Roster
 Big House
 The Fairfield Four
 Mike Henderson
 Kieran Kane
 Fats Kaplin
 Charlie Major
 David Olney
 Tammy Rogers
 Harry Stinson
 Kevin Welch

See also
 List of record labels

External links
Official site

American country music record labels
Record labels established in 1994
American independent record labels